Capacities is the third album from the Filipino independent band Up Dharma Down.

Track listing

Personnel
Armi Millare - keyboards, vocals
Carlos Tañada - lead guitars
Ean Mayor - drums and loops
Paul Yap - bass

References

2012 albums
Up Dharma Down albums